Eucalanidae is a family of copepods belonging to the order Calanoida.

Genera:
 Eucalanus Dana, 1852
 Pareucalanus Geletin, 1976

References

Copepods